Andrew Ramsey may refer to:

Andrew Ramsey (footballer), Scottish footballer
Andrew Ramsey (ice hockey); see 2006–07 NCAA Division I men's ice hockey season
Andrew Ramsay (geologist) (1814–1891), Scottish geologist (sometimes spelt "Ramsey")

See also
Andrew Ramsay (disambiguation)